The Frankenfood Myth: How Protest and Politics Threaten  the Biotech Revolution is a book written by Hoover Institution research fellow Henry I. Miller and political scientist Gregory Conko and published by Praeger Publishers published in 2004.  In it Conko argues against over-regulation of genetically modified food and it features a foreword by Nobel Peace Prize-winner Norman Ernest Borlaug.

In an interview, Conko described Frankenfood Myth as follows:

"It's not a point-by-point refutation of all   the misconceptions that are being spread about agricultural biotechnology.   The primary mess that we tackle has to do with an attitude that is being spread by both opponents of biotechnology and by a lot of its supporters that it is somehow uniquely risky and   therefore should be subject to special caution and special regulatory oversight."

A Barron's reviewer wrote:
"The heated debate over so-called Frankenfoods is not only about   the pros and cons of genetically manipulating crops to improve   their nutritional value and resistance to disease; it also concerns intellectual honesty. For years, activists opposed to  the new science have been spreading unfounded and inaccurate horror stories, threatening to derail progress vitally needed to feed  the world.  the Frankenfood Myth by Henry Miller and Gregory Conko takes a long, hard look at both   the new agricultural biotechnology and  the policy debate surrounding it."

See also
Genetically modified food controversies

References 

2004 in the environment
Current affairs books
Genetic engineering and agriculture